Sha Xin Wei is a media philosopher and professor at the School of Arts, Media + Engineering in the Herberger Institute for Design and the Arts + Ira A. Fulton Schools of Engineering at Arizona State University. He has created ateliers such as the Synthesis Center at Arizona State University, the Topological Media Lab at Concordia University, and Weightless Studio in Montreal for experiential experiments and experimental experience.

Sha’s writing and media art concern topological dynamical approaches to poiesis, play and process. Trained in mathematics at Harvard and Stanford, his work ranges from gestural media, movement arts, and realtime media installation through interaction design to critical studies, philosophy of technology, and complex biosocial systems.  He publishes in speculative philosophy, experimental media arts, science and technology studies, and computer science.

Academic

Sha Xin Wei was trained in Mathematics at Harvard University and Stanford University.

Following his studies in Mathematics, for more than a decade Sha worked in the fields of scientific computation, mathematical modeling, and the visualization of scientific data and geometric structures.  In 1995, he extended his work to network media authoring systems and media theory, coordinating the Interaction and Media Group at Stanford University.

In 1997, Sha co-founded Pliant Research with colleagues from Xerox PARC and Apple Research Labs, dedicated to designing technologies that individuals and organizations can robustly reshape to meet evolving socio-economic needs.

In 1998, he co-founded the Sponge art group in San Francisco in order to build public experiments in phenomenology of performance. With Sponge members and other artists, Sha directed event/installations in prominent experimental art venues, including Ars Electronica (Austria), V2 (The Netherlands), Medi@Terra Athens, Banff Centre for Arts and Creativity, and Future Physical United Kingdom.  He has also exhibited media installations at Postmasters Gallery (New York).

He obtained an interdisciplinary Ph.D. in 2001 on differential geometric performance and the technologies of writing in Mathematics, Computer Science, and History & Philosophy of Science at Stanford University.

From 2001 to 2004, Sha was Assistant Professor in the School of Literature, Communication and Culture at the Georgia Institute of Technology in Atlanta.  In 2001, Sha established the Topological Media Lab for the study of gesture and improvisation of collectively meaningful movement from both experiential and computational media perspectives at the Graphics and Visualization and Usability Center in the College of Computing.

From 2005 to 2014, Sha served at Concordia University in Montreal, Canada as the Canada Research Chair in Media Arts and Sciences and as Associate Professor of Fine Arts and Computer Science.  In 2005 he became the Director of Hexagram's Active Textiles and Wearable Computers Axis.  During his time at Concordia University, he directed the Topological Media Lab as an atelier for the study of gesture, distributed agency, and materiality with application to the phenomenology of performance and the built environment.

From 2014 to 2020, as the second Director of the School of Arts, Media and Engineering at ASU, Sha led the maturation of its transdisciplinary culture into a balanced ecosystem of scholarly and artistic practices, doubling the faculty as students flocked to AME’s programs in media arts and sciences.   During this time, Sha also directed Synthesis at ASU as a model for experiential and experimental research-creation.

Sha has been a visiting scholar or faculty in History of Science at Harvard University as well as the Program in Science, Technology, and Society at The Massachusetts Institute of Technology (MIT), Centre for Modern Thought at King's College, Aberdeen, History and Philosophy of Science & Department of French and Italian at Stanford University. He is Senior Fellow with the Global Center for Biosocial Complex Systems at ASU, and Building21 at McGill University.

Since 2017 Sha has lectured at the European Graduate School on philosophy, media and alternate ecologies and economies.

He is a member of the editorial boards of the Artificial Intelligence and Society Journal, the Experimental Practices book series and the Architectural Intelligences book series with Rodopi Press, Inflexions, FibreCulture, and the International Journal of Creative Interfaces & Computer Graphics.

Sha has served on the governing boards of Alliance for the Arts in Research Universities, and Leonardo International Society for the Arts, Sciences and Technology.

Professional

Sha Xin Wei has founded and directed creative ateliers for experiential experiments and experimental experience. These include: Pliant Research, Silicon Valley (1997-2001), designing sociotechnical systems that are not brittle but respond to social need and aspiration, with partners from Apple Research, Xerox PARC; Sponge group, San Francisco (1997-2002), designing environments as experiential and experimental art; Community Capital, Silicon Valley (2010-2012), designing novel model of value-producing social processes; Alkemie, Montreal (2012-2017), designing responsive media platforms; and XPRR Montreal, Phoenix & Montréal (2017-2020), designing experimental installations and media in public space.

Since 2020, Sha is the founder and director of Weightless Studio, an engineering and computational design studio specialized in the creation of innovative responsive environments and complex system simulations.

Creative works

Sha's art research includes the TGarden playspaces (Ars Electronica, DEAF, MediaTerra Athens, SIGGRAPH), Hubbub speech-sensitive urban spaces, Membrane calligraphic video, Softwear gestural sound instruments, the WYSIWYG gesture-sensitive sounding weaving, Ouija performance-installations, and kinetic / light sculpture responding to movement and gesture, such as Cosmicomics Elektra, eSea Shanghai, the IL Y A video membrane Stanford/Berkeley, Time Lenses Beall Center, and Palimpsest Paris. With Michael Montanaro, Sha created media instruments for a stage work inspired by Shelley's Frankenstein. In collaboration with Oana Suteu Khintirian, Todd Ingalls, and Ginette Laurin, he created the Serra vegetal life environment. Sha has exhibited work in the prominent media arts venues: Ars Electronica Austria, DEAF Rotterdam, Medi@Terra Athens, Banff Centre for Arts and Creativity, Future Physical UK, Elektra Montréal, eArts Shanghai, and the Musée des arts et métiers Paris.  He has exhibited media installations at Postmasters Gallery New York and Suntrust Gallery Atlanta.

Honors and awards
Sha's collective and individual art works have been recognized with awards from the Daniel Langlois Foundation for Art, Science, and Technology, the  LEF Foundation, the Canada Foundation for Innovation, the Creative Work Fund (New York), the Rockefeller Foundation and the Canada Council for the Arts.

Publications
Book

Poiesis and Enchantment in Topological Matter. Cambridge, MA: The MIT Press 2013

Chapters in Books or Special Volumes

with Garrett Laroy Johnson. “Rhythm and Textural Temporality: Experience without Subject and Duration as Effect.” In Rhythm and Critique: Technics, Culture and Capital, ed. Paola Crespi and Sunil Manghani. University of Edinburgh Press, 2020, 101-123.

with Brandon Mechtley, Todd Ingalls, Julian Stein, Connor Rawls. 2019. SC: A Modular Software Suite for Composing Continuously-Evolving Responsive Environments. In: Philip Beesley, Sascha Hastings, Sarah Bonnemaison (eds.) Living Architecture Systems Group White Papers. Kitchener, Ontario: Riverside Architectural Press.

“In conversation: Catherine Wood and Sha Xin Wei,” in Mirror-Touch Synaesthesia: Thresholds of Empathy with Art, ed. Daria Martin, Oxford Press, 2018, ch 16.

“Theater Without Organs: Co-Articulating Gesture and Substrate in Responsive Environments,” in Living Architecture Systems Group White Papers, ed. Philip Beesley and Ala Roushan, Toronto: Riverside Architectural Press, 2016, pp. 276–291.

“X is for Signature,” in “Ink: V is for Vermillion as described by Vitruvius, An A to Z of Ink in Architecture,” Graduate School of Architecture, Planning + Preservation, Columbia University, 2013.

“Prospective Architectures of Enchantment,” in 70 Jähren Festschrift Dedicated to Professor Helgi-Jon Schweizer, 2009.

“Whitehead and Poetical Mathematics,” in Deleuze, Whitehead and the Transformations of Metaphysics. eds. Andre Cloots & Keith A. Robinson. Belgium: KVAV, 2005, pp. 107– 116.

“Poetics of Performative Space,” in Cognition, Communication and Interaction: Transdisciplinary Perspectives on Interactive Technology (Human-Computer Interaction Series), ed. Satinder Gill, Berlin: Springer-Verlag, 2007, pp. 549–566.
 
Timothy Lenoir and Sha Xin Wei, “Authorship and Surgery: The Shifting Ontology of the Virtual Surgeon,” in Bruce Clarke and Linda Dalrymple Henderson, ed., From Energy to Information: Representation in Science and Technology, Art, and Literature, Stanford University Press, 2002, pp. 283–308, pp. 415–419.

“Cathedral, Tool or Framework? MediaWeaver As a Distributed Scholarly Workspace,” in Augmenting Comprehension: Digital Tools and the History of Ideas, ed. Dino Buzzetti, Giuliano Pancaldi, and Harold Short, (London: Office for Humanities Communcation, King's College London), 2004, pp. 101–112.

Articles

“The Square Root of Negative One is Imaginary.” In Special Issue on Ontogenetic Process, edited by Cary Wolfe and Adam Nocek. Angelaki 25.3 2020, 64-82.

Yanjun Lyu, Brandon Mechtley, Lauren Hayes, Sha Xin Wei. “Tableware: Social Coordination through Computationally Augmented Everyday Objects Using Auditory Feedback.” HCI International 2020. 14 pages.

Seth Dominicus Thorn, Halley Willcox, and Sha Xin Wei. “Processual and Experiential Design in Wearable Music Workshopping.” In Proceedings of ACM Conference on Movement & Computing, Jersey City, NJ USA, July 2020 (MOCO’20), 8 pages.

Shomit Barua, Yanjun Lyu, Connor Rawls, Peter Weisman, Christy Spackman, Xin Wei Sha, “tivity Café: Prototyping the Dining Event,” ISEA 2020.

with Seth Thorn, “Instruments of Articulation, Gesture Signal Processing in Live Performance,” MOCO 2019.

Brandon Mechtley, Todd Ingalls, Lauren Hayes, Julian Stein, Garrett Johnson, Byron Lahey, Jessica Rajko, Seth Thorn, Emiddio Vasquez, Connor Rawls, Assegid Kidane, Sha Xin Wei, “Composing Ecosystemically in Responsive Environments with Gestural Media, Objects and Textures,” 17–19 March 2019, ASU Tempe AZ, improvisationalenvironments.weebly.com

Brandon Mechtley, Christopher Roberts, Julian Stein, Benjamin Nandin, Sha Xin Wei, “Enactive Steering of an Experiential Model of the Atmosphere,“ Human-Computer Interaction International, Las Vegas, 15–20 July 2018.

Michael Krzyzaniak, Rushil Anirudh, Vinay Venkataraman, Pavan Turaga, Sha Xin Wei, “Towards Realtime Measurement of Connectedness in Human Movement,“ 2nd International Workshop on Movement and Computing Intersecting Art, Meaning, Cognition, Technology — Simon Fraser University, 14–15 August 2015.

Evan Montpellier, Nikos Chandolias, Assegid Kidane, Garrett Johnson, Omar Faleh, Todd Ingalls, Sha Xin Wei, “Suturing Space: Tabletop Portals for Collaboration,” HCI International, Los Angeles, 5–7 August 2015.

Navid Navab, Doug van Nort, Sha Xin Wei, “A Material Computational Approach to Gestural Sound,“ NIME Goldsmiths 2014.

Nikolaos Chandolias, Sha Xin Wei, “Speech Platform For a Story Telling Room,” ACM Multimedia, Barcelona, October 21–25, 2013.

Omar Faleh, Julian Stein, Sha Xin Wei “Amorphous lighting network in controlled physical environments,“ CHI Paris, April 27 - May 2, 2013.

“Sha, Xin Wei, Adrian Freed, Navid Navab, “Sound Design As Human Matter Interaction,” Computer-Human Interaction, Paris, April 2013.

“Topology and Morphogenesis,” Special Issue on a Topological Approach to Cultural Dynamics, ed. Celia Lury, Theory, Culture and Society, 29.4-5, July–September, Nottingham Trent: TCS Centre, 2012, 220–246.

“An Experiment in Autonomous Cultural Production”, AI and Society 25th Anniversary Special Issue, London: Springer-Verlag, 2012. Online 10.1007/s00146-012-0416-0, 13 pp.

“The Atelier-Lab as a Transversal Machine,” Les études américaines à l’ère des médias numériques : nouveaux objets, nouvelles pratiques, ed. Yves Abrioux, Revue Française d’Études Américaines, 2011/2, no. 128, p. 62-78, color plates I-VIII.

Sha Xin Wei, Michael Fortin, Navid Navab, Tim Sutton, “Ozone: Continuous State-based Media Choreography System for Live Performance,” ACM Multimedia, Firenze, October 2010, 1383-1392.
 
“Calligraphic Video: Using the Body’s Intuition of Matter,” Inaugural Issue of the International Journal of Creative Interfaces and Computer Graphics, 2009.

Sha Xin Wei, Michael Fortin, Jean-Sebastien Rousseau, “Calligraphic Video: A Phenomenological Approach to Dense Visual Interaction,” ACM Multimedia, Beijing China, 19–24 October 2009.

with Doug Van Nort, David Gauthier, Marcelo M. Wanderley, “Extraction of Gestural Meaning from a Fabric-Based Instrument,” ICMC International Computer Music Conference Proceedings, 2007.
 
with David Birnbaum, Freida Abtan, Marcelo M. Wanderley, “Mapping and Dimensionality of a Cloth-based Sound Instrument,” Proceedings of Sound and Music Computing (SMC), Lefkada Greece, 11–13 July 2007.

“Poetics of Performative Space,” AI & Society 21.4, in 20th Anniversary Birthday Issue: From Judgement to Calculation, June 2007, 607-624.

“Ethico-aesthetics in t* Performative Spaces,” in TRG: On Transient Realities and Their Generators, eds. Maja Kuzmanovic and Tim Boykett, Kibla, 2006, 22-39.

“Whitehead’s Poetical Mathematics,” Configurations, 13.1, 2005, 77–94.

“Whitehead and Poetical Mathematics,” In Deleuze, Whitehead and the Transformations of Metaphysics. eds. Andre Cloots & Keith A. Robinson. (Belgium: KVAV, 2005), 107- 116.

“The TGarden Experimental Performance Project,” Modern Drama, Volume 48, Number 3, Special Issue: Technology, Toronto: University of Toronto Press, Fall 2005, 585-608.

Sha Xin Wei and Satinder Gill. “Gesture and Response in Field-Based Performance,” 5th conference on Creativity & Cognition. Ed. University of Technology Sydney Ernest Edmonds, Australia. London: ACM, 2005, 205-09.

Chris Salter and Sha Xin Wei, “Sponge: A Case Study in Practice-Based Collaborative Art Research,” 5th conference on Creativity & Cognition, ed. University of Technology Sydney Ernest Edmonds, Australia, London: ACM, 2005, 92-101.

“Differential Geometrical Performance and Poiesis,” in Configurations, Vol 12, Number 1, Winter 2004, 133-160.

with Yoichiro Serita, Jill Fantauzza, Steven Dow, Giovanni Iachello, Vincent Fiano, Joey Berzowska, Yvonne Caravia, Delphine Nain, Wolfgang Reitberger, Julien Fistre, “Expressive Softwear and Ambient Media,” in Adjunct Proceedings of Ubicomp 2003, 131-136.

“Continuous Sensing of Gesture for Control of Audio-Visual Media,” with Giovanni Iachello, Steven Dow, Yoichiro Serita, Tazama St. Julien, Julien Fistre, in ISWC2003 Proceedings, pp. 236–237. http://csdl2.computer.org/persagen/DLAbsToc. jsp?resourcePath=/dl/proceedings/&toc=http://csdl2.computer.org/comp/proceedings/ iswc/2003/2034/00/2034toc.xml

“Resistance Is Fertile: Gesture and Agency in the Field of Responsive Media,” in Makeover: Writing the Body into the Posthuman Technoscape, Two-Part Special Issue, Baltimore: Johns Hopkins University Press, Part 2: Configurations, Vol 10, Number 3, Summer 2002, 439-472.

“Sustainable Arenas for Weedy Sociality | Distributed Wilderness,” with Maja Kuzmanovic, Proceedings CPSR Directions and Implications of Advanced Computing Symposium in Seattle DIAC 2002,113 - 119.

“Speechpainting - An Architectural Medium,” FineArtForum, vol 15, no. 10, October 2001. 
“Sponge, The Surface That Holds the Image is Unstable,” with sponge, éc/artsS:#2[00_01], Spécial: Textualités & Nouvelles Technologies, Fall 2000.

Sha Xin Wei and Maja Kuzmanovic,“From Representation to Performance: Responsive Public Space,” Proceedings CPSR Directions and Implications of Advanced Computing, Seattle Symposium (DIAC 2000).

“The Virtual Edge – Tracing the Postmodern Surgeon,” with Tim Lenoir, Proceedings of Energy To Information Conference in Austin, Texas, April 3–5, 1997.

James Ze Wang, Gio Wiederhold, Oscar Firschein, Sha Xin Wei, “Content-Based Image Indexing and Searworksching Using Daubechies’ Wavelets,” Int. J. on Dgiital Libraries 1.4 (1998) 311-28.

“Wavelet-Based Image Indexing Techniques with Partial Sketch Retrieval Capability.” with James Ze Wang, Gio Wiederhold, Oscar Firschein, Advances in Digital Libraries (1997).

“MediaWeaver and Networked Scholarly Workspaces.” Multimedia Systems Journal 6.2 (1996) 97-111.

“MMDB: A Meta-testbed for Distributed Multimedia.” Proceedings of AAAI Workshop Indexing and Reuse in Multimedia Systems (1994).

with Haas, Cathy, “Stanford American Sign Language videodisc project,” in Proceedings of the Johns Hopkins National Search for Computing Applications to Assist Persons with Disabilities. Los Alamitos, CA : IEEE Comput. Soc. Pr. (1992) 41-44.

References

External links
 ArtSci Magazine Straight Talk:  Sha Xin Wei &  the Synthesis Center https://www.sciartmagazine.com/straight-talk-sha-xin-wei.html December 2018
 TEDxASU Sha Xin Wei, I - We - World : Toward Ecosystemic Technologies https://www.youtube.com/watch?v=BuB91q-bK0k 25 March 2019
 Research Outreach :What media arts can teach us about technology and its use https://researchoutreach.org/articles/what-media-arts-can-teach-us-about-technology-and-its-use/ March 2020
 World Economic Forum, What media arts can teach us about technology and its use https://www.weforum.org/agenda/2021/03/this-is-how-virtual-simulations-can-help-us-prepare-for-crises/
 Sha Xin Wei, academia.edu
 The Synthesis Center
 The Topological Media Lab
 The School of Arts, Media and Engineering, ASU  
 The Herberger Institute for Design and the Arts, ASU

Arizona State University faculty
Living people
Harvard University alumni
Stanford University alumni
Year of birth missing (living people)